Vishtaspa, hellenized as Hystáspes, may refer to:

 Vishtaspa (fl. between 10th and 6th century BCE, if historical), the first patron of Zoroaster
 Hystaspes (father of Darius I) (fl. 550 BCE), satrap of Bactria and possibly also of Fārs, and father of Darius the Great
 Hystaspes (son of Darius I) (fl.  480 BCE), son of Darius the Great
 Hystaspes (son of Xerxes I) (fl. c. 460 BCE), son of Xerxes I of Persia